Leo Chan Kong Pan (born 13 April 1996 in Hong Kong) is a former Hong Kong professional football player who played as a centre back. And Chan works as a football coach currently.

Club career
On 10 January 2015, Chan made his first professional debut in the Hong Kong Premier League in a 4-1 win for Hong Kong Pegasus.

In 2015, Chan signed for Hong Kong Premier League club Southern. And he exposed more in the games as the coach from Southern started to play 3 in the back. 

On 16 March 2020, Chan scored his first goal from the FA Cup  against Taipo Football Club. 

On 31 August 2021, Chan joined Taipo Football club 

On 11 July 2022, Centreback Chan Kong-pan scored two goals – one in each half – to lead Taipo Football Club to their first trophy since winning the Premier League in 2018-19. However, he refused to promote with the club for the coming season and he will remain to be a football coach.  

On 1 September 2022, Chan joins Eastern District Sports Association.

References

External links
 
 Chan Kong Pan at HKFA
 

1996 births
Living people
Hong Kong footballers
TSW Pegasus FC players
Southern District FC players
Hong Kong First Division League players
Hong Kong Premier League players
Association football defenders
Association football central defenders